Proverbs and Songs is a live album by the English saxophonist John Surman of a suite of choral settings of Old Testament texts. It was recorded on 1 June 1, 1996, at Salisbury Cathedral with the organist John Taylor and released on the ECM label. It also featured the 75-strong Salisbury Festival Chorus. It was nominated for the Mercury Music Prize in 1998. Surman performed the suite several times after the 1996 performance.

Reception

The AllMusic review awarded the album 2.5 stars. Alyn Shipton wrote that Surman's "unaccompanied choral writing was rich and unusual and elsewhere the sense of jazz rhythm and forward motion came almost exclusively from his saxophone, creating rich ostinatos, or swirling aggressively among the choral parts".

Track listing
All music by John Surman and text from the Old Testament
 "Prelude" - 3:11
 "The Sons" - 4:55
 "The Kings" - 6:41
 "Wisdom" - 7:39
 "Job" - 4:50
 "No Twilight" - 7:42
 "Pride" - 5:00
 "The Proverbs" - 4:06
 "Abraham Arise!" - 5:24

Personnel
John Surman – soprano saxophone, baritone saxophone, bass clarinet
John Taylor – organ
Salisbury Festival Chorus conducted by Howard Moody

References

ECM Records live albums
John Surman albums
1997 albums